Eduardo Benedito Lopes (born 19 September 1964, in Santo André) is a Brazilian politician and a member of the Brazilian Republican Party (PRB). He served as Minister of Fishing and Aquaculture in the government of Dilma Rousseff.

Lopes was elected in 2010 as the first surrogate of senator Marcelo Crivella. Due to Crivella's resignation to assume the office of mayor of Rio de Janeiro, Eduardo assumed the office as permanent senator.

He is an evangelical and a member of the Pentecostal movement the Universal Church of the Kingdom of God (IURD).

References

|-

1964 births
Living people
People from Santo André, São Paulo
Republicans (Brazil) politicians
Brazilian Socialist Party politicians
Members of the Federal Senate (Brazil)
Members of the Universal Church of the Kingdom of God
Brazilian Pentecostals
Brazilian evangelicals
Government ministers of Brazil